The 2016–17 Wisconsin Badgers men's basketball team represented the University of Wisconsin–Madison in the 2016–17 NCAA Division I men's basketball season. The Badgers were led by second-year head coach Greg Gard and played their home games at the Kohl Center as members of the Big Ten Conference. They finished the season 27–10, 12–6 in Big Ten play to finish in a tie for second place. Wisconsin defeated Indiana and Northwestern in the Big Ten tournament, but lost to Michigan in the championship game. The team received an at-large bid to the NCAA tournament, its 19th consecutive trip to the NCAA Tournament, as a No. 8 seed in the East region. The Badgers defeated Virginia Tech in the First Round and upset No. 1 overall seed and defending National Champion Villanova to advance to the Sweet Sixteen for the fourth consecutive year. In the Sweet Sixteen, they lost to 20th-ranked Florida on a last second 3.

Previous season
The Badgers finished the 2015–16 season with a record of 22–13, 12–6 in Big Ten play to finish in a four-way tie for third place in conference. They were upset by Nebraska in the second round of the Big Ten tournament. They received an at-large bid to the NCAA tournament as a No. 7 seed, their 18th straight appearance in the Tournament. They defeated Pittsburgh and Xavier to advance to the Sweet Sixteen for the third consecutive year. In the Sweet Sixteen, they lost to Notre Dame.

Departures

2016 Commitments

2017 Commitments

2018 Commitments

Roster

Schedule and results

|-
!colspan=12 style=""| Exhibition

|-
!colspan=12 style=""| Non-conference regular season

|-
!colspan=12 style=|Big Ten regular season	

|-
!colspan=12 style=""|

|-
!colspan=12 style=""|

Rankings

*AP does not release post-NCAA tournament rankings

Player statistics

See also
 2016–17 Wisconsin Badgers women's basketball team

References

Wisconsin Badgers men's basketball seasons
Wisconsin
Wisconsin
Badgers men's basketball team
Badgers men's basketball team